Jack Devnarain (born 9 February 1971), is a South African actor. He is best known for the roles in the television serials The Ghost and the Darkness, Isidingo and Mayfair.

Personal life
He was born on 9 February 1971 in Tongaat, Durban, KwaZulu-Natal, South Africa. His mother was a drama teacher.

He is married to Pam Devnarain and is a father of two children.

Career
He started his acting career in Durban through the community theatre circuit. During this period, he studied law at the University of KZN and graduated in 1993. In 1996, he made his acting debut in the film The Ghost and the Darkness with a minor role. Then in 1998, he appeared in the popular television serial Isidingo with a supportive role 'Rajesh Kumar' which became very popular. After graduation, he served in the Police Service for nine years until 2003 in the Rapid Response and Crime Prevention units where he was famous for his arrests and convictions. However, he continued to appear in television, cinema and theater during his busy lawful life.

In 2002, he moved to Johannesburg to be a professional actor. He later received a SAFTA nomination as the Best Lead Actor in a Feature Film. In 2015, he was being a part of the Trek4Mandela group that summited Kilimanjaro on Mandela Day 2015, which is an effort to raise funds to support Caring4Girls. He has then served as a member of the Executive Committee of South African Guild of Actors (SAGA) since 2010.

In 2018, he appeared in the South African Indian action crime film Mayfair. He played the supportive role of 'Jalaal' in the film, which later received positive reviews. The film was also screened at the 62nd BFI London Film Festival and Africa in Motion Film Festival in October 2018.

Filmography

References

External links
 
 Former 'Isidingo' star Jack Devnarain alerts president to brewing storm
 Actors are told 'take it or leave it', says former 'Isidingo' star

Living people
South African people of Indian descent
South African male film actors
South African male television actors
People from Durban
South African television directors
1971 births